The 2017 F4 Spanish Championship was the second season of the Spanish F4 Championship. It was a multi-event motor racing championship for open wheel, formula racing cars regulated according to FIA Formula 4 regulations, taking place in Spain, France and Portugal. The championship featured drivers competing in 1.4 litre Tatuus-Abarth single seat race cars that conformed to the technical regulations for the championship. The series was organised by Koiranen GP and RFEDA.

MP Motorsport driver Christian Lundgaard won the drivers' championship after winning in the finale at Estoril. While his team successfully defended teams' title. Aleksandr Smolyar finished as runner-up to Lundgaard, winning more races than him, but Smolyar wasn't consistent as Lundgaard and lost by 36 points. The only other winner was another MP driver Bent Viscaal, who was victorious at Nogaro and Estoril and completed the top-three in the driver standings. Javier González, Guillem Pujeu, Tuomas Haapalainen and Lukas Dunner visited a podium step and shared places in top-eight in the driver standings. While Marta García, who finished ninth, was the only woman in the championship and the only competitor in the Female driver trophy, which she received at the end of the season.

Entry list

Race calendar and results

The provisional calendar was announced on 17 April 2017 and officially confirmed the 24 May 2017. The opening round in Alcañiz was in the support of the 2017 World Series Formula V8 3.5 while other round were stand-alone.

Championship standings

Drivers' championship
Points were awarded to the top 10 classified finishers in each race. No points were awarded for pole position or fastest lap.

Female Trophy F

Teams' championship
Points were awarded to the best 2 classified of each team.

References

External links
 

Spanish F4 Championship seasons
Spanish F4
F4 Spanish Championship
Spanish F4